Southwest Business Corporation (SWBC) is a diversified financial services company providing insurance, mortgage, and investment services to financial institutions, businesses, and individuals.

Headquartered in San Antonio, Texas, SWBC employs nearly 2,600 people nationwide and is licensed to do business in all 50 U.S. states.  

SWBC is privately held by co-founders Chairman Charlie Amato and President Gary Dudley.  Although privately held, a public accounting firm audits the company's operations and financials on an annual basis.

Lines of business
SWBC offers insurance and financial products for financial institutions, businesses, and individuals.

For financial institutions, SWBC provides auto, mortgage, and commercial loan portfolio management, consumer lending services, fee income generation, real estate lending, insurance programs, and investment services.

For businesses, SWBC provides human resource and payroll services, commercial insurance products, employee benefits, investment services, liability insurance, life insurance, employee mortgages, and executive benefits.

For individuals, SWBC provides personal property and casualty (P&C) insurance, including auto, homeowners, flood, excess flood, renters, valuable personal property, watercraft, classic cars, motorcycle, and umbrella liability insurance. SWBC also offers wealth management and home mortgages.

Target market

SWBC is licensed to market and service in all 50 states. The services for businesses and financial institutions are targeted at any business located in the United States.

References

External links 
 SWBC home page

Financial services companies of the United States
Companies based in San Antonio
Financial services companies established in 1976
1976 establishments in Texas